Ri Yong-ae (born 4 November 1965) is a retired North Korean long jumper.

Her personal best jump was 6.79 metres, achieved in May 1988 in Kuala Lumpur. This is the current North Korean record. She also holds the national 100 metres record.

Achievements

References

External links

1965 births
Living people
North Korean long jumpers
North Korean female sprinters
Athletes (track and field) at the 1992 Summer Olympics
Olympic athletes of North Korea
Asian Games medalists in athletics (track and field)
Athletes (track and field) at the 1990 Asian Games
Athletes (track and field) at the 1998 Asian Games
Female long jumpers
Asian Games bronze medalists for North Korea
Medalists at the 1990 Asian Games